Poraće is a village in the municipality of Fojnica, Bosnia and Herzegovina.

Demographics 
According to the 2013 census, its population was 14.

References

External links 
 Satellite view of Poraće on fallingrain.com

Populated places in Fojnica